Carnoustie Panmure Football Club are a Scottish Junior football club from the town of Carnoustie, Angus.

History
Formed in 1936, they are nicknamed the Gowfers due to the town's well-established links to the sport of golf ("gowf" in Scots). They play at Laing Park, to which they moved in 2004, having previously played at Westfield Park.

The club received significant investment in the late 1990s, which has allowed them to emerge as one of the stronger Tayside clubs participating in the East Region. The pinnacle of their achievements was winning the Scottish Junior Cup in 2004.

The club has an Academy with players aged 5–8yrs, a youth set up with teams from 9s to under-19s, two amateur teams using the Carnoustie YM name and four girls teams from Monifieth Ladies. In 2013 the club became a Scottish Charitable Incorporated Organisation to provide a pathway for players from Youth to Adult football and to improve sports facilities in the town. In 2013 the club had 350 players across 18 teams.

Honours
Scottish Junior Cup
 Winners: 2003–04
 Runners-up: 2000–01
SJFA Midlands League

 Winners: 2021–22

Other honours
 Tayside Premier Division winners: 1975–76, 1976–77, 1977–78, 1978–79, 1980–81
 East Region Tayside Premier winners: 2003–04
 Tayside Division One winners: 1970–71, 1991–92
 Dundee Junior League winners: 1950–51, 1951–52, 1952–53, 1955–56, 1957–58, 1964–65, 1965–66
 Currie (Findlay & Co) Cup: 1971–72, 1975–76, 1977–78, 2002–03, 2006–07
 North End Challenge Cup: 2001–02, 2004–05, 2006–07, 2007–08
 DJ Laing Homes League Cup: 2000–01
 Intersport Cup: 1994–95
 Division One (Downfield SC Cup) winners: 1989–90
 Tayside Drybrough Cup: 1975–76, 1977–78
 Tayside Regional Cup: 1975–76, 1977–78
 Arbroath & District Cup: 1936–37
 Courier Cup: 1949–50, 1951–52, 1953–54
 Cream of the Barley Cup: 1977–78
 Inter-Regional Cup: 2017–18

Notable former managers
 Ally Gallacher
 Bobby Geddes
 George O'Boyle

External links
 Club website
 Youth website

 
Football clubs in Scotland
Scottish Junior Football Association clubs
Football clubs in Angus, Scotland
Association football clubs established in 1936
1936 establishments in Scotland
Carnoustie